The  Annual 6th Mzansi Kwaito and House Music Awards is the 6th edition  of Mzansi Kwaito and House Music Awards. It was held at Sun City Super Bowl, North West.

The nominees were announced on June 16, 2021. Trompies  lead the nominations with 4.

Background  
The ceremony is scheduled  to take place at Sun City Super Bowl, North West on November 27, 2021. The full list of nominees  for the 6th ceremony of Mzansi Kwaito and House Music  awards was announced on June 16, 2021.

Winners and nominees 
Below the list are the nominees. Winners are listed first and in bold.

References

2021 music awards